The 1999 Arizona Wildcats football team represented the University of Arizona during the 1999 NCAA Division I-A football season. Led by head coach Dick Tomey in his thirteenth season, the Wildcats finished with a 6–6 record (3–5 against Pac-10 opponents) and missed out on a bowl game.

After entering the year with high expectations after a dominant 1998 season, the Wildcats were outplayed and blown out by Penn State in the opener and never fully recovered. They were 5–2 and 6–3 at different points during the year, but would lose out, including a rivalry loss to Arizona State to end the season, which knocked them out of the postseason picture.

Before the season
Arizona completed the 1998 season with a 12–1 record and defeated Nebraska in the Holiday Bowl. Many fans have rated the season as the best in school history.

The team entered the 1999 season with many of their offensive starters returning and hoped to improve from the previous season and contend for the Pac-10 title and a chance to finally earn a spot for the Rose Bowl that has eluded them during the decade, as well as being contenders for a potential national championship.

Tomey brought in a top recruiting class to the program in an effort to help the team move one step closer to achieving its goals. By the preseason, the Wildcats were ranked third in the polls, which was the highest in team history to start a season.

Schedule

Rankings

Game summaries

Penn State
Arizona began the season with a trip to Penn State. It was the first ever meeting between the Wildcats and Nittany Lions. Due to the highly anticipated matchup between the top-5 teams (Arizona ranked third and Penn State fourth), ESPN’s College GameDay came to State College the morning of the game. It was the first time that GameDay involved an Arizona game.

In the game, in front of a national television audience (broadcast on ABC), the Wildcats watched as they would be dominated by the Lions in all phases. The only bright spot for Arizona was a touchdown scored in the game’s final minute that prevented a shutout. The blowout loss ended Arizona’s chances for a national title and dropped out of the top ten polls.

After the game, Tomey said that the team was largely affected by the loud atmosphere at Penn State, turnovers, and poor coaching decisions. He also said that it was difficult to beat a team with a legendary coach and that the result would be different had the Wildcats played the Lions at home instead.

TCU
After being destroyed at Penn State, the Wildcats stayed on the road for their next game at TCU in another first-meeting matchup. In the first half, the story was the same for Arizona, as the Horned Frogs would lead 25-7 at halftime. By the second half, Arizona began coming back with touchdowns and took the lead late in the fourth quarter. The Wildcats would stop TCU on their final drive to complete the comeback victory, which may have saved the season for Arizona.

Stanford
After Arizona defeated Middle Tennessee in their home opener in yet another first-meeting game, they hosted Stanford. The Wildcats would score first, but would make mistakes that led to the Cardinal pulling away by halftime. Arizona made a comeback in the third quarter to cut into Stanford’s lead. However, in the fourth quarter, the Cardinal broke the game open to give the Wildcats their second loss of the season and jeopardizing their Rose Bowl hopes. Also, it was Arizona’s first loss to Stanford since 1990, snapping a six-game winning streak. Stanford would ultimately go on to appear in the Rose Bowl.

Washington State
The Wildcats traveled to Washington State looking to get back into the win column. In a back and forth battle with the Cougars, the Wildcats drove to midfield in the final seconds. Quarterback Keith Smith threw a Hail Mary pass that was caught in the end zone by receiver Bobby Wade as time expired to give Arizona the wild victory. The winning play was known to fans as the “Hail Bobby”.

USC
Arizona hosted USC (ranked 22nd) in their next game. With Trung Canidate and Dennis Northcutt leading the way, the Wildcats took control of the game and seemed to seal it on a fumble return for a touchdown. However, the Trojans scored in the final minute to cut Arizona’s lead to seven, but an onside kick attempt would go out of bounds, and the Wildcats held on for the win. This would be Arizona’s last home win over the Trojans until 2012.

Oregon
The Wildcats would welcome Oregon for another big test. Arizona would compete with the Ducks all game long, with both teams trading scores, with Northcutt keeping the Wildcats in it with a pair of touchdowns. Oregon took the lead with over a minute remaining in the fourth quarter and the Wildcats had one final chance. Arizona would get into Oregon territory and ultimately miss a potential tying field goal to lose. The loss would end all chances that Arizona had to earn a Pac-10 title and Rose Bowl bid. 

The Wildcats’ kicker, Mark McDonald, who missed the field goal, received insults and death threats by fans, and would ultimately leave the team. He had been 1 for 10 in field goal tries, with his only make in the win over USC (McDonald had winning kicks against San Diego State and California in 1997 and was part of the Wildcats’ memorable 1998 team).

UCLA
Arizona went to the Rose Bowl to face UCLA, who dealt the Wildcats their only loss in the previous season that prevented them from playing the actual Rose Bowl game. The Wildcats had a new kicker, Sean Keel, who was the backup to McDonald. Keel became the full-time kicker after McDonald decided to leave the program after missing a late game-tying field goal in the loss to Oregon and being threatened by fans. Keel would eventually be the Wildcats’ primary kicker for the rest of his career.

The Wildcats would give up an early score before bouncing back with Keel making his first field goal and Canidate rushed for two touchdowns. Northcutt led the receiving corps and Arizona avenged their loss to the Bruins from the 1997-98 seasons and gave them their sixth win of the year. It was the Wildcats’ first win in Pasadena since 1990 and their first sweep of the Los Angeles teams since the same year.

Washington
On homecoming day (and the home finale), the Wildcats hosted Washington, looking for a chance to clinch a bowl berth with a seventh victory. Unfortunately, mistakes would cost the Wildcats which would lead to points by the Huskies. Arizona tried to come back late, but would fall short as the Huskies got revenge on Ortege Jenkins and the Wildcats (who beat Washington the previous year on Jenkins’ somersault touchdown) and officially ended Arizona’s Rose Bowl hopes for good.

Arizona State

In the annual “Duel in the Desert”, the Wildcats continued to look for a bowl bid as they traveled to Tempe to take on Arizona State. It was the 100th anniversary of the rivalry’s first game between the teams, with both schools holding centennial celebrations.

Despite big plays by Arizona’s offense, which included 80-yard touchdowns by Canidate and Northcutt (with the latter also returning a punt for a score), their defense struggled as they had trouble slowing down the Sun Devils’ strong offense. The 42-27 loss led the Wildcats to ending the season with a three-game losing streak and prevented them from earning a bowl bid. ASU went on to clinch a bowl bid of their own, which was the Aloha Bowl. It was the Wildcats’ first loss in Tempe since 1991.

Awards and honors
Dennis Northcutt, WR, Consensus and AP All-American, First-team All-Pac-10

Trung Canidate, RB, First-team All-Pac-10

Marcus Bell, LB, Second-team All-Pac-10

Brandon Manumaleuna, TE, Second-team All-Pac-10

Joe Tafoya, DT, Second-team All-Pac-10

Bruce Wiggins, OL, Second-team All-Pac-10

Steven Grace, OL, Second-team All-Pac-10

Season notes
Arizona was unable to improve from their 1998 season with a .500 record (6–6 record) in the 1999 season. The season was affected by a tough schedule, team mistakes, and poor decisions by the players and coaches. A major factor in the mediocre season was the loss of Chris McAlister to both graduation and the NFL that led Arizona’s defense in 1998 and without him, the Wildcats’ defense heavily struggled.

The loss to Penn State ended hopes of Arizona rebuilding a dynasty under Tomey and would lead to the downfall of the program at the turn of the century. The Wildcats would not schedule another game with Penn State in the future (which would have possibly been played in Tucson in 2000) due to fears that they would not win against the Nittany Lions and that it would be too expensive to do so.

After the Penn State game, College GameDay would not involve going to a campus for a game featuring Arizona until November of 2009 when it came to Tucson for the Wildcats’ matchup with Oregon.

Arizona Stadium unveiled a new scoreboard behind the north end zone. It featured a large video screen and a new sound system. The lights in the score box where the total number of points scored were originally lit in gold before switching to red before the game against Washington. This scoreboard would last until it was torn down after the 2011 season.

In addition to getting a new scoreboard, Arizona Stadium’s field was the same except a 100th anniversary logo was placed over the two “Block ‘A’”s on each 25-yard line, as Arizona celebrated the 100th anniversary of its football program during the season. A special 100th anniversary logo was patched on the team’s home and road uniforms as well.

Arizona began the season with three consecutive games against teams that they have never played before and played them for the first time (Penn State, TCU, Middle Tennessee State). The games against Penn State and Middle Tennessee remain the Wildcats’ only meetings against them, whereas they would play TCU again in 2003 (in which they would ultimately lose).

It was the second consecutive season that Arizona played the first two games on the road.

After beating Washington State, they would not win another game with a Hail Mary touchdown pass until 2014, when they defeated California with the play.

The win over USC was the Wildcats’ first and only home win over a Pac-10 opponent during the season.

After the loss to Oregon, a McDonald’s location near the Arizona campus featured signs of a kicker missing a field goal and a referee signaling the kick as “no good”, which was a pun on the original Wildcat kicker, Mark McDonald, who shared the same name of the fast-food chain, as a joke. The signs were taken down after the season ended.

The loss to Washington caused many fans to give up on the season and focused on the Wildcats’ basketball season as that team was successful in winning unlike the football team who could not meet expectations.

The rivalry loss at Arizona State not only ended the season, it ended the Wildcat careers of Smith, Canidate, and Northcutt, all of whom led to Arizona’s offense to dominate in 1998. Had they won more games and went to a major bowl, Canidate would have joined Northcutt as a consensus All-American. Canidate was a possible Heisman contender before the Wildcats’ loss to Penn State in the opener ended those chances.

Northcutt was known to fans as “Dennis the Menace” (named after the fictional character that shares Northcutt’s first name), as he blew away opposing defenses with his long catch-and-runs and touchdowns during his Arizona career. He currently holds the Arizona record for single-season receiving yards, which was this season, with 1,422. He is ranked third in career receptions (223), second in single-season receptions (88 this year), and second in career receiving yards (3,252), surpassed by teammate Bobby Wade in all three categories. Northcutt is ahead of Wade in career touchdowns with 24 (to Wade’s 23) and third in single-game receiving yards (257 in the win over TCU this year). For his performance this season, Northcutt was honored as a consensus All-American. 

Canidate rushed for 1,602 yards this season, which is ranked in Arizona history, and was the record holder until Ka’Deem Carey broke it in 2012. He is also second to Carey in career rushing yards with 3,824. 

The Wildcats’ loss to Arizona State started a current run of futility for the, in the rivalry, as Arizona would only win seven of 21 meetings against ASU since 2000. Before this year, the Wildcats dominated the Sun Devils, going 13–3–1 against them between 1982 and 1998.

This season would be the last official year of the “Desert Swarm” era, as the defense would become inconsistent in 2000 onwards. The offense, known as the “Desert Storm” (the opposite of the Swarm) would continue until the end of the 2002 season, which was Wade’s final season.

After the season
The 1999 season would become a step towards the end of Tomey’s tenure, as another mediocre season in 2000 in which Arizona would collapse in the second half, would lead to his resignation as coach and the program struggling for most of the next decade. Many Wildcats have often blamed the opening season loss to Penn State as the cause of the team’s fall from success and the program not being the same for several years due to the Wildcats’ inability to get to the Rose Bowl under Tomey and his future successors.

References

Arizona
Arizona Wildcats football seasons
Arizona Wildcats football